Around the World in 80 Days is a 2004 designer board game by Michael Rieneck.

Theme
The theme is derived from the classic 1873 novel by Jules Verne.

Reception
Around the World in 80 Days was nominated for the 2005 Spiel des Jahres award, and came sixth in the 2005 Deutscher Spiele Preis.

Reviews
Pyramid

References

External links

Board games about history
Board games introduced in 2004
India in fiction
Mumbai in fiction
Game